Noah Paul Welch (born August 26, 1982) is an American former professional ice hockey defenseman who played in the National Hockey League (NHL) with the Pittsburgh Penguins, Florida Panthers, Tampa Bay Lightning and the Atlanta Thrashers. Welch completed his professional career in Europe, most notably winning two Swedish Hockey League championships with the Växjö Lakers.

Welch was an Alternate captain for the United States at the 2018 Winter Olympics in South Korea.

Playing career
Welch was drafted by the Pittsburgh Penguins in the 2001 NHL Entry Draft, chosen 54th overall in the 2nd round. Noah was the captain of the Harvard University Hockey team, graduating in 2005. Before his college career at Harvard he played high school hockey at St. Sebastian's School in Needham, Massachusetts.

Welch made his NHL debut in the latter stages of the 2005–2006 season for the Penguins in a victory over the NY Islanders picking up his first NHL point with an assist. In his next game against the Montreal Canadiens, having replaced the suspended Eric Cairns, he suffered a nightmare start, scoring in his own net, but made amends by scoring his first NHL goal in the third period against the team he always cheered against as a child and Boston Bruins fan. In total he scored four points (one goal, three assists) in five games. He was named to the AHL 2007 All-Star game, representing the Wilkes-Barre/Scranton Penguins.

On February 27, 2007, Welch was traded by the Penguins to the Florida Panthers in exchange for Gary Roberts. After two seasons with the Panthers, Welch was traded along with a third round draft pick to the Tampa Bay Lightning for defenseman Steve Eminger. A short time after that, he instead signed a one-year contract with the Atlanta Thrashers.

For season 2011–12, Welch signed a one-year contract with the Swedish team HV71 in the Swedish elite league Elitserien (SEL). He scored 10 points in 51 games. In May 2012 he signed a one-year contract with the SEL team Växjö Lakers and eventually stayed three years in Växjö, helping the club capture the 2015 SEL championship, while being presented with the Stefan Liv Memorial Trophy as MVP of the SHL playoffs.

He left the Lakers after winning the title and then spent one season with Modo Hockey, before signing with fellow SHL side Malmö Redhawks for the 2016–17 campaign.

Welch returned to the Lakers for his final professional season in 2017–18. While largely affected throughout the season with injury, Welch retired after helping the Lakers claim their second Swedish Championship. Welch now owns and operates The Dome Red Deer, a 107,000 square foot state of the art athletic development facility in Red Deer, Alberta.

Personal
Welch decided to donate his brain to concussion research at the Center for the Study of Traumatic Encephalopathy at the Boston University School of Medicine after his death. He has a degree in government from Harvard. In the summer of 2011, Welch married teammate Paul Postma's sister Alissa Postma.

Career statistics

Regular season and playoffs

International

Awards and honors

References

External links

1982 births
Living people
American men's ice hockey defensemen
Atlanta Thrashers players
Chicago Wolves players
Florida Panthers players
Harvard Crimson men's ice hockey players
HV71 players
Ice hockey people from Boston
Malmö Redhawks players
Modo Hockey players
Olympic ice hockey players of the United States
Ice hockey players at the 2018 Winter Olympics
Pittsburgh Penguins draft picks
Pittsburgh Penguins players
Rochester Americans players
Tampa Bay Lightning players
Växjö Lakers players
Wilkes-Barre/Scranton Penguins players
AHCA Division I men's ice hockey All-Americans